Lyla Berg (born March 15, 1951) is a Hawaiian Democratic politician. She was first elected to the Hawaii House of Representatives in 2004 representing the Kāhala area of Honolulu on Oahu. Berg was a Democratic candidate for Lieutenant Governor of Hawaii in the 2010 election.
She was attacked for having sponsored a resolution to designate an Islam Day in 2009; critics claimed that according to the Julian Calendar, the holiday celebrated the September 11 attacks. 
She lost in the primary to Brian Schatz.

References

Democratic Party members of the Hawaii House of Representatives
Women state legislators in Hawaii
People from Honolulu
Living people
1951 births
21st-century American women